Adventureland Resort (often referred to as Adventureland for short) is a theme park in Altoona, Iowa (just northeast of Des Moines). It is marketed as featuring over 100 rides, shows and attractions.

History
Construction of Adventureland Park began in 1973 on a site formerly occupied by a small airport in Des Moines, active in the 1920s until a larger municipal airport was built in 1933 at a different location. The area was later used for farming until Adventureland's construction broke ground. Its grand opening was scheduled for July 1974, but the park suffered light damage from a tornado, delaying the opening until late August.

The first full season began in 1975, and several rides were added that year. A wooden roller coaster called Tornado was added in 1978, named after the tornado that delayed the park's grand opening. 

In 2002, Adventureland undertook an 8 million dollar project that nearly doubled the size of the hotel, adding a second courtyard, new pools with interactive water features and new poolside rooms and suites. It also added a new water ride in the park, a spinning white water adventure, called Saw Mill Splash. The ride is themed around an old saw mill and fits into the western motif of Adventureland's Outlaw Gulch area.

In 2006, Adventureland added two more rides, The Splash Over and Frog Hopper. Later that year in October, founder Jack Krantz died, and his sons and daughters took over the operations.

On February 20, 2010 (about 4:00 p.m.), a fire broke out in the toy store of main street after its roof collapsed due to the weight of ice and snow. The collapse caused an electrical fire. The fire went out of control and engulfed the corner portion of Main Street and destroyed the section that encompassed the bingo parlor, restaurant, toy store and arcade. The fire was brought under control about an hour later and was completely extinguished an hour thereafter. None of the adjacent structures or rides were harmed and no one was injured. The buildings were destroyed so quickly because, due to their age, sprinklers were not required to be installed. The park opened as planned on April 24, 2010, with the east side of Main Street completely cleared to dirt surrounded by a chain link fence. Banners on the fence stated that "Plans are well underway to build Main Street back better than ever."

All of Main Street was rebuilt when the park opened in April 2011 and featured an even larger arcade with an indoor ride. The park's Scrambler ride, previously known as the Wrangler, was brought out of storage and moved to the G-Force's location after the G-Force was moved into the Main Street arcade. On December 15, 2011 (about 3:45 a.m.), another fire broke out, this time destroying the Rally Round corn dog stand. Crews said the fire had engulfed the structure when they arrived but they were able to put it out quickly. According to fire officials, an electrical transformer behind the corn dog stand was the cause. A larger food location would be built in its place.

On September 6, 2013, Adventureland posted on their official Facebook page that a new attraction called Storm Chaser would be added. A 3D rendering of the ride was posted on the page, as well as an interview with park officials, showed that the new ride is a Mondial WindSeeker model. Park officials also stated that it would be replacing the aging Silly Silo due to that ride's frequent down time and the company no longer making parts to fix it.

On July 8, 2015, Adventureland announced that they were adding a new roller coaster called The Monster, a Gerstlauer Infinity coaster and the first of its kind in the United States. It opened to the public on June 4, 2016 after park employee previews a few days earlier. It replaced the River Rapids log ride, which ran since the park first opened. The Monster features a unique nighttime LED light display made up of 137 track mounted fixtures that synchronize to the ride vehicles, and 46 ground lights. The Monster lighting system originator and designer, Mike Lambert, was recognized with (2) Illuminating Engineering Society (IES) Illumination Awards for Innovation in Design.

On September 20, 2017, Adventureland announced a new children's area called Bernie's Barnyard. It opened on July 20, 2018 it includes two family rides, a playground and kiddie arcade games. It replaced the Country Picnic area just behind the Storm Chaser.

Sometime in mid-April 2018, crews dismantled the Inverter, which had been sitting on the spot where Super Screamer used to be since 2000. It broke down early in the 2017 season and was closed the rest of the year, and was later determined that the ride would be taken down and put up for sale. It is currently sitting in pieces in the maintenance shed at the front of the park. For the 2018 Oktoberfest, the Inverter's old space was used for inflatables for the adults. On December 11, 2018, Adventureland announced on its Facebook page that it will be adding Phoenix, a $6 million spinning coaster from Maurer Rides. It opened on July 4, 2019, replacing the Inverter. It is the park's sixth roller coaster and the second-largest investment on a ride in Adventureland history behind the Monster.

On May 17, 2020 Adventureland teased a picture of a knight slaying a dragon (reference to the park's 1990 O.D. Hopkins double looping rollercoaster, the Dragon). The same day, crews were spotted dismantling the Dragon and a new teaser was posted with the title "The Dragon Slayer." The coaster opened on May 29, 2021. The Splash Over was also removed in 2020 and replaced by the stage. It is unclear if a new ride will take it's place in the future. 

On September 8, 2021, Adventureland announced their plans to remove the Lighthouse, Lady Luck and Falling Star due to the parts are no longer available. The Raging River will remain closed after the July 3rd, 2021 incident. In addition, Adventureland also announced 10 new attractions that will be coming next year including a Renaissance Fair.

On December 21, 2021, it was announced that Palace Entertainment would be acquiring Adventureland.

Themed areas and attractions

The park contains many design nods inspired by Disneyland. The entrance has a train station with two tunnels (on the left- and right-hand side) leading into the Main Street area, just like at Disneyland or Walt Disney World's Magic Kingdom (and also similar to many other parks built since Disneyland opened in 1955); over in Outlaw Gulch, there are several tombstones that have virtually the same wording as tombstones outside of Walt Disney World's Haunted Mansion attraction; the rocking pirate ship (Galleon) has played a soundtrack that included splashing water and an excerpt from the Pirates of the Caribbean theme song, "Yo Ho". Adventureland is a theme area of its own at Disneyland. The different themed areas in Adventureland are:
 Adventure Bay (opened June 22, 2008) is a location behind Outlaw Gulch that is home to the Kokomo Kove water play area.
 Alpine Village/Bavaria is a German-themed area. Sky Ride is the major attraction in this area of the park, along with the Rathskeller concession stand and Alpine Arcade. In 2015, the new Bier Garten opened featuring TV sets and German beers. In early years, an accordion player was found in this area of the park to add to the German feel.
 Bernie's Barnyard is a children's area which replaced the Country Picnic Ground Area which had been there since 1988 and was removed in 2017, the area opened on July 20, 2018, The Area has a playground structure, a toddler play area, Kiddie Arcade Games, gift shop, seating and shaded areas, statue of the park's mascot Bernie Bernard, food stand and two kid's rides: a Crazy Couch from Skyline Attractions called Shakin' Bacon and a Pony Trek from Metallbau EmmeIn called Junior Jockeys.
 The Boulevard has several major rides; the biggest is Giant Sky Wheel, the largest open-gondola Ferris wheel built in the United States since G.W. Ferris built his wheel in 1893 for the Chicago Exposition.
 County Fair is a rural-themed area whose principal attraction is Tornado, a large wooden roller coaster, as well as many fair-themed games of skill.
 Dragon Island, near the rear of the park, was originally known as Riverview. Constructed in 1979, the area contained a number of attractions from the Riverview Park amusement center that had recently closed in nearby Des Moines. In 1990, the area was renamed Dragon Island when the Dragon roller coaster opened.
 Iowa Farm follows a similar theme. The big pig in the Iowa Farm section of the park is actually a small concession stand.
 Last Frontier is a western themed section. This section of the park is home to the Golden Nugget shooting gallery and Sam Adam's Saloon.
 Main Street, which resembles a stereotypical turn-of-the-20th-century town square, is the first area that visitors encounter upon entering the park. The principal attractions of this area are the A-Train (a small-scale locomotive which winds around one side of the park) and an antique-style carousel in the middle of the Town Square. Main Street contains the bulk of the park's shops and a restaurant. Also on Main Street is the Palace Theater. It was formerly home to large live shows but today is only used for corporate events.
 Outlaw Gulch, constructed in 1993, has an Old West theme, complete with a "ghost town". The attractions in this part of the park are The Outlaw (a small CCI wooden roller coaster), Chuck Wagon (a small western-themed Ferris wheel), Sidewinder (a swinging pendulum ride whose gondola swings riders over 180 degrees while spinning) and Saw Mill Splash, a water ride. The Royal Hanneford Circus is also presented. During the 1993 season, there was a western-themed band that played a banjo and bottles on the mock stage that still remains behind to the kettle corn stand. Also in the first few years of operation, a cowboy-themed comedy show was held in front of the ghost town facade, but it was later removed and the shooting gallery was installed there. The food location also changed from a walk-in drink and snack bar to a front counter serving hamburgers and other fast food. Other food vendors in the section include a kettle corn stand, old fashioned sodas and Dippin' Dots.
 River City is built around the Raging River ride and was inspired by Mississippi River towns. There is usually jazz or zydeco music in the background. The founder of Adventureland was a fan of New Orleans-style jazz. River City may have been influenced by the fictional River City in the Meredith Willson musical The Music Man. Several food stands are located in this section of the park as well.
 Space Shot Midway is built around the Space Shot ride. Another attraction is The Underground, a ride that incorporates elements of both a dark ride and a roller coaster.  The Frantic Freeway bumper cars and numerous kids' rides are also nearby.

Rides

Roller coasters

Other rides

Former attractions

Adventure Bay 
Adventure Bay is the water park section of Adventureland. Except for Kokomo Kove, it was new for 2010. In addition to the water features, it offers changing areas, lockers for rent, lounge chairs and food service which includes a full-service bar named the Sand Bar.

Games areas
The games department consists of three games areas:
 Alpine Games – Alpine is located near the front of the park close to the Giant Sky Wheel.
 County Fair – opened 1980, According to park operators, this is Adventureland's most popular games area. County Fair is a rather large games area and features many popular games, including Speedball, Derby Downs, Center Ring and Skee Ball. County Fair is unique in that the area is very long, whereas the other two areas are more circular. The north part of the area, sometimes called "The Iowa Farm Section," is where the entrance to Tornado is located. The Iowa Farm Section features Speedball, County Fair's most popular game.
 Dragon Island – renamed as Dragon island in 1990 the area was originally called Riverview Island which was built in 1980, Despite not being as big as County Fair or Alpine, Dragon Island ranks 2nd in popularity. Dragon Island has a much different atmosphere than County Fair or Alpine. While County Fair and Alpine have a more fun atmosphere, playing upbeat, popular music that most guests will be able to recognize, Dragon Island has a more mellow atmosphere, playing slow music without vocals.

Food
The park features snack stands and sit-down counter service locations. The sit-down locations include Coca Cola Cafe, Doc & Leone's Diner, and Rathskeller.

Special events
Every year on July 4, Adventureland presents fireworks 15 minutes before the park closes.

Adventureland also hosts various events during the off-season when the park is closed. Visitors enter through an open gate at the front entrance and are allowed only in the Main Street Palace Theater which is connected to the Doc and Leone's Diner on Main Street for food and snacks.

During the first few weekends of operation, various school bands are invited to play in the park.

Each year, substance-free days are held in conjunction with D.A.R.E.

Over Memorial Day weekend there is a military promotion.

There are four park areas available for company picnics, reunions or other large gatherings.

On October 3, 2015, Adventureland hosted its first Oktoberfest event. A $10 admission (with free parking) included one beer and access to a limited selection of rides and attractions during this one day event. Dozens of food and drink stands were brought in to the park (many from outside vendors). As of 2022, the event had been moved to the end of September, and full-price admission was $69.99.

Shows

Current shows
 Ben Ulin magic show, added in 1988, in Sam Adam's Saloon. 
 Comedy Juggler Brad Weston at the Coca-Cola Cafe.
 Iowa Beer and Wine Shop stage and Rathskeller Biergarten feature live local music acts.
 American Puppet Theater, performed and created by Libby Weston, at the Chapel stage.

Former shows
 Adventureland Circus (2017-2020) Replaced the Royal Hanneford Circus with Billy Martin remaining as Ring Master. 
 Circo de Luz (2021-2022) Circus relocated to the area west of Frantic Freeway, with Billy Martin remaining as Ring Master. 
 Dolphin Sea Lion Show (1977–1979 & 1988-1989) Located where The Underground is now. The swimming pool remains.
 Daniel and the Dixieland Diggers (1983-1999). Animatronic music show in the center of Main Street, replaced by the Carousel.
 Family Fun Zone (1992-1994) Contestants were selected from the audience to participate in stunts and games like Beat The Clock. The Underground is now in this space.
 High Diving Act, (1980-1982, 1986-1987, 1990-1991) Located where The Underground is now. The swimming pool remains.
 Palace Theater shows (1974-1996), live shows were formerly held in the Palace Theater.
 Royal Hanneford Circus (1997–2016) replaced by the Adventureland Circus, the Circus tent was originally located behind the Outlaw. In 2008 construction of the water park caused the circus to be relocated just behind the Saw Mill Splash with a new access walkway between that ride and exit of the Outlaw.

Incidents
Several incidents have occurred at Adventureland, two of which resulted in deaths.

Dragon
On June 8, 1991, four riders were injured on Dragon when its lift chain broke. All four were treated for minor injuries at a nearby hospital, and the ride was repaired and returned to operation.

Tornado 
On July 28, 2006, an 11-year-old girl sustained head trauma after being struck by a piece of wood left behind by maintenance staff on Tornado. The injured girl was transported to a local hospital where she underwent surgery for a severe blood clot and swelling.

Raging River
On June 7, 2016, a 68-year-old employee attendant on the platform of the Raging River ride fell onto the conveyor belt system that moves rafts back up to the boarding station. According to a witness account, the employee lost his balance as the operator set the rafts in motion. He suffered a fractured skull resulting in a severe brain injury and died three days later at a nearby hospital. Iowa's Occupational Safety and Health Administration conducted an investigation that found no evidence the park willfully violated safety protocols, and that the ride was operating as designed. The park was fined a maximum $4,500 for the accident, and OSHA recommended installing additional controls to prevent the movement of the ride until all ride operators were in a safe location.

On July 3, 2021, a raft on Raging River carrying six passengers overturned, sending four guests to a local hospital with severe injuries. One of the passengers, an 11-year-old boy, later died. The ride was inspected the day before the incident and was found to be in normal working order. Although park officials said their employees' actions were "prompt", eyewitness accounts stated that first responders were off-duty emergency personnel from the Altoona police and fire departments that were not notified by park staff. A review of the communication during the incident show that 911 dispatchers were first notified by a bystander. When firefighters arrived, they faced multiple obstacles including a chained gate entrance to the park designated for emergency responders. Ambulances originally went to the wrong gate in the confusion, and when they arrived at the proper gate more than 15 minutes into the response, direct access was blocked by the setup for the nightly fireworks display, causing an additional delay. Ride operators also did not perform CPR, which may have resulted from a lack of training.

Underground
On July 30, 2019, a child was injured while riding The Underground when his foot became lodged between the train car and the loading platform as the ride was leaving the station. The ride was stopped, and the child was treated for an ankle injury at a local hospital.

Sky High Coasters contractor
On January 23, 2023, Zachary Alesky, a 20-year old contractor for Sky High Coasters, slipped on ice while carrying a steel beam and was crushed by it. He was revived but died in surgery.

References

External links
 
 

Amusement parks in Iowa
Water parks in Iowa
1974 establishments in Iowa
Buildings and structures in Polk County, Iowa
Tourist attractions in Polk County, Iowa
Animatronic attractions
Amusement parks opened in 1974